José Elizardo Aquino Jara was a Paraguayan general who was considered a hero of the War of the Triple Alliance. He was one of the first senior Paraguayan military leaders to die in combat. Aquino was a lieutenant colonel at the time of being shot during the Battle of Boquerón.

Early years
José Elizardo Aquino was born in Zárate Isla, Luque in 1825. He was the fifth of eleven siblings of the marriage of the Spanish Patricio Aquino and the Paraguayan Rosa Isabel Jara. One of his sisters was named V Vicente.

Military career
In 1847 Aquino joined the Paraguayan Army as a member of Battalion No. 2 of Asunción. He was transferred to the Paso de Patria camp that was recently installed. Due to his handicraft conditions, he was put at a very young age in charge of the Ybycuí iron foundry, where cannons and ammunition were manufactured for the army. Later he worked in the Shipyards of the Ribera, where he developed tasks as a naval carpenter. He collaborated (with his famous "chaflaneros") in the construction of the first Paraguayan railway, between Areguá and Paraguarí.

When the Paraguayan War began, Aquino (39 years old) was promoted to captain. He created the Corps of Sappers and worked on the fortification of Humaitá, where the Passage of Humaitá would take place. He embarked north under the command of General Barrios. In the Mato Grosso Campaign, he had a relevant performance that earned him special mentions from Marshal López. In 1865 he distinguished himself in the operations of the South commanded by General Bruguez.

Aquino heroically participated in the Battles of Riachuelo, Mercedes and Paso de Cuevas. His fearlessness earned him the nickname Tigre de la Vanguardia, and earned him the National Order of Merit and promotion to lieutenant colonel.

For his participation in the Battle of Estero Bellaco on May 2, 1866, he was promoted to the rank of colonel. Before the Battle of Boquerón, under the orders of General José E. Díaz and Major Jorge Thompson, he organized the trenches in the fields of Boquerón and Sauce.

In a memorable action on July 16, 1866, Aquino personally led the 6th, 7th and 8th battalions on a counterattack to regain lost positions. In one of the advances, when the Imperial Brazilian Army was retreating in complete disorder, Aquino threw himself mounted on an overo through the middle of the enemy soldiers.

Aquino was shot on the stomach by a rifle bullet from another of the fleeing Brazilian soldiers. His assistants picked him up and took him to the Paso Pucú headquarters. There, Solano López promoted him to brigadier general on his deathbed. He died at age 42, three days later and his remains were buried near that barracks.

One hundred and two years later, on November 27, 1968, the Luque municipal council, appointed by the dictator Alfredo Stroessner, had Aquino's remains transferred from the Paso Pucú military cemetery to Luque to be deposited in the mausoleum built in his honor in Elizardo Aquino square in the city of Luque. The architectural project of the mausoleum was carried out by the Luqueño architecture student César Vera, with the sponsorship of Dr. Reinerio Martínez Duarte.

Legacy
The Nueva Trinacria colony, a village populated by Italian immigrants, which is located 278 km northeast of Asunción, was renamed General Elizardo Aquino. Route 3 is also named after Aquino.

Family
In the history of this war, there was a Ensign with the surname of Aquino but it's unknown if he is one of Elizardo's brothers.

References

Further reading
 InfoLuque.com.py Biography of General Elizardo Aquino Jara.

1825 births
1866 deaths
People from Luque
Paraguayan generals
Paraguayan military personnel of the Paraguayan War
Paraguayan military personnel killed in action